Korission Lagoon is a coastal lagoon located in the southern part of the Greek island of Corfu, in the Ionian Sea. It is located near the village of Agios Mattheos and is separated from the sea by Chalikouna Beach. It has a surface area of 427 ha (approx. 1 050 acres) and it drains into the sea through a channel which bisects Chalikouna Beach. The lagoon was created by the sand dunes that cut the lake's basin off from the sea between 140,000 and 250,000 years ago.

There are also small reed beds and groves of tamarisk, white water lilies (Nymphaea alba) and 14 different species of orchid in the dunes. The lagoon has had over 126 species of birds recorded, including among others great cormorants, Eurasian wigeons, great egrets and greater flamingo. There are also many species of butterfly, as well as the Jersey tiger moth (Euplagia quadripunctaria). The Corfu dwarf goby is endemic to the lagoon and its surrounding springs. Other fish species found in the waters of the lagoon include the Mediterranean killifish (Aphanius fasciatus) and the Epiros minnow (Pelasgus thesproticus). Reptiles present in the area include the chelonians Hermann's tortoise (Testudo hermanni), the European pond turtle (Emys orbicularis) and the Balkan pond turtle (Mauremys rivulata), while among the snake species recorded are the javelin sand boa (Eryx jaculus) and the four-lined snake (Elaphe quatuorlineata). The mammals present include greater horseshoe bats (Rhinolophus ferrumequinum), long-fingered bats (Myotis capaccinii) and, possibly, European otters (Lutra lutra).

Korission Lagoon and its environs are also important area archaeologically including finds such as a tool found by French geologists was determined to be between 950 and 750,000 years old, the oldest known prehistoric artifact discovered in Greece. Another find consisted of a large portion of a right lower jaw of a hippopotamus, along with some small bone fragments discovered near the lagoon's outflow. In total, 160 stone artifacts and 61 bone fragments have been found in the vicinity of the Korission Lagoon. These finds emphasise the requirement to further explore the archaeology of the area and for its protection.

References

Wetlands of Greece
Corfu
Natura 2000 in Greece